is a Japanese swimmer. She competed in two events at the 1984 Summer Olympics.

References

External links
 

1965 births
Living people
Japanese female backstroke swimmers
Olympic swimmers of Japan
Swimmers at the 1984 Summer Olympics
Place of birth missing (living people)